Muhammad Nur Aiman Bin Rosli (born 22 March 1999) is a Malaysian professional racing cyclist, who currently rides for UCI Continental team .

Major results

2016
 3rd Time trial, National Junior Road Championships
2019
 6th Team time trial, Asian Road Championships
 10th Time trial, National Under-23 Road Championships
2020
 National Road Championships
1st  Time trial
5th Road race
2021 
 1st  Time trial National Road Championships

References

External links

Living people
1999 births
Malaysian male cyclists
Cyclists at the 2018 Asian Games
Cyclists at the 2018 Commonwealth Games
Commonwealth Games competitors for Malaysia
Competitors at the 2021 Southeast Asian Games
Southeast Asian Games bronze medalists for Malaysia
Southeast Asian Games medalists in cycling